The Daniel H. Hughes House, at 213 W. O'Bannon St. in Morganfield, Kentucky, is a historic house which was listed on the National Register of Historic Places in 1980.

Its front section is a two-story, brick, Italianate-style T-plan house, which has a projecting facade with a semi-octagonal one-story bay.  It has various Italianate details.  This section was added onto an earlier structure, from the early 1800s, which is a one-story, Federal-style house.

References

National Register of Historic Places in Union County, Kentucky
Italianate architecture in Kentucky
Houses on the National Register of Historic Places in Kentucky
Morganfield, Kentucky